Euodynerus auranus is a species of stinging wasp in the family Vespidae.

Subspecies
These four subspecies belong to the species Euodynerus auranus:
 Euodynerus auranus albivestis (Bohart, 1939) c g
 Euodynerus auranus aquilus Bohart, 1974 c g
 Euodynerus auranus auranus g
 Euodynerus auranus azotopus (Bohart, 1939) g b
Data sources: i = ITIS, c = Catalogue of Life, g = GBIF, b = Bugguide.net

References

Further reading

External links

 

Potter wasps
Insects described in 1906